Banyan is a type of tree.

Banyan may also refer to:

 Banyan (album), 1997 debut album by Banyan
 Banyan (band), a musical group based in Los Angeles, California
 Banyan (clothing), a men's dressing gown or informal coat
 Banian, Guinea, alternative spelling
 Banyan, Iran (disambiguation), places in Iran
 Banyan merchants, an expression referring to Indian merchants used widely in many parts of India and countries in the Indian Ocean trade
 Banyan Productions, a Philadelphia-based television production company
 Banyan switch, a complex crossover switch in electronics
 Banyan Systems, the software company that created Banyan VINES
 Banyan tree in Lahaina, a notable tree in Hawaii
 Banyan VINES, a computer network operating system and accompanying protocols
 The Banyan, a social aid organization based in Chennai, India
 Typhoon Banyan, several tropical cyclones have been named Banyan

See also 
 Banian (disambiguation)
 Banya (disambiguation)